Richard Linder (April 6, 1923April 19, 1959) was a professional race car driver from Pittsburgh, Pennsylvania. Linder raced USAC open wheel as well as NASCAR stock cars. Between 1949 and 1956 he entered 28 NASCAR events, winning three with eight additional Top 10 finishes. Linder's three wins came behind the wheel of his Oldsmobile; Dayton, OH 8/20/1950, Hamburg, NY 8/27/1950, and Vernon, NY 10/1/1950. His final NASCAR race was the 1956 Beach Course event at Daytona. He raced there several times including an 18th-place finish in 1951. Linder recorded over 110 victories at various Pennsylvania race tracks. He and his brother Gus Linder are members of The Pittsburgh Circle Track Club Hall of Fame.

During a USAC Champ Car event at Trenton Speedway in April 1959, Linder tried to avoid hitting Don Branson, who was spinning in front of him. His racer crashed through the guard rail and rolled over once, landing on its wheels. Linder, who was 36 years old, died of a broken neck.

Linder's Vargo Special was the same car in which Van Johnson would be killed a few months, Hugh Randall a few years later.

References

External links
 

1923 births
1959 deaths
Sportspeople from Pittsburgh
Racing drivers from Pennsylvania
Racing drivers from Pittsburgh
NASCAR drivers
Racing drivers who died while racing
Sports deaths in New Jersey